The Mitchell Wing P-38, also called the Lightning, is an American ultralight aircraft that was designed by Jim Mead and produced by Mitchell Aircraft Corporation. The aircraft was supplied as a kit for amateur construction.

Design and development
It features a strut-braced low-wing, a double tail, a single-seat, open cockpit, tricycle landing gear and a single engine in pusher configuration. The aircraft is named after the Second World War vintage Lockheed P-38 Lightning, with which it shares its dual tail layout.

The aircraft is made from aluminum tubing, with the wing leading edge made from birch plywood, supported by foam and wooden wing ribs. The wings and tail surfaces are covered in doped aircraft fabric. Its  span wing employs a NACA 23015 airfoil and features flaperons. The wing is supported by lift struts that are mounted to a central inverted "V" kingpost. The landing gear has bungee cord suspension and the nose wheel is steerable. The Cuyuna 430R powerplant is mounted behind the pilot with the propeller above the twin tail booms

Specifications (P-38)

References

External links
Photo of a P-38

Homebuilt aircraft
Single-engined pusher aircraft